The Story of Luke is a 2012 American comedy-drama film written and directed by Alonso Mayo. It is Mayo's first feature-length film and tells the story of Luke, a young man with autism who embarks on a quest for a job and a girlfriend. It stars Lou Taylor Pucci, Seth Green, Cary Elwes and Kristin Bauer.

Cast
 Lou Taylor Pucci as Luke
 Seth Green as Zack
 Cary Elwes as Paul
 Kristin Bauer as Cindy
 Kenneth Welsh as Jonas
 Tyler Stentiford as Brad
 Mackenzie Munro as Megan
 Sabryn Rock as Maria
 Lisa Ryder as Sara
 Zoë Belkin as Charlene
 Dewshane Williams as Sam 
 Art Hindle as Mr. Nichols
 Michael Kinney as Counselor Bobby
 John Boylan as Mr. Harrison

Production

Development
The film was inspired by director Alonso Mayo's experiences at Centro Ann Sullivan del Perú. While finishing his undergrad studies in film and journalism in Peru, Mayo helped produce a series of training videos for creating supported employment programs and met many men and women with autism and other developmental disabilities. Later, while writing the screenplay for The Story of Luke, Mayo returned to Centro Ann Sullivan del Perú on a research trip and shot the documentary Just Like Anyone.

Filming
The Story of Luke was produced by DViant Films and Fluid Film. Filming took place in Sault Ste. Marie, Ontario, Canada in 23 days in August and September 2011. To prepare for the role of Luke, Lou Taylor Pucci spent time with young men with autism spectrum disorders in Sault Ste. Marie.

Release
The Story of Luke premiered at the 2012 San Diego Film Festival, where it won Best Film. It has gone on to win over 20 film festival awards including Best Film at San Antonio Film Festival, Garden State Film Festival and San Luis Obispo International Film Festival. It was released theatrically and on demand in the United States and Canada on April 5, 2013 by Gravitas Ventures. It was released on DVD on August 6, 2013.

Reception

Autism community reception
The Story of Luke received positive reviews from the autism community, especially for Lou Taylor Pucci's portrayal of a man with autism. Psychology Today columnist and autism advocate Chantal Sicile-Kira wrote, "Most parents of youths with autism will find this movie uplifting and encouraging—we all hope and wish our youths will be successful in finding employment and someone to love… Lou Taylor Pucci's portrayal of Luke is spot on. His manners, gestures and tone of voice feel authentic."

The film also received the endorsement of advocacy organization Autism Speaks. Leslie Long, Director of Housing and Adult Services wrote, "Luke transforms the people around him that were under the assumption they would be caring for him. This is not unique but not often discussed either. Most people have not had the pleasure of really knowing someone with autism in all facets of their lives so they miss the nuances of their humor or the effortless ways they tell the whole truth."

Critical reception
The Story of Luke garnered mostly positive reviews from film critics. Review aggregator Rotten Tomatoes gives the film an 80% approval rating based on 5 reviews.

Mark Olsen of the Los Angeles Times wrote, "Mayo's script avoids turning Luke into some wise holy fool, allowing him to make missteps along the way... "The Story of Luke" is not a saga of epic proportions, but with a huge assist from Pucci's layered performance, takes a premise that could easily be movie-of-the-week sappy and finds a humanizing lightness."

Daniel M. Gold of The New York Times wrote, "Mr. Pucci (“Thumbsucker,” “The Music Never Stopped”) gives a thoughtful and nuanced performance but gets few favors from the script, which puts him front and center in almost every scene... the film serves as a modest reminder that the challenges of autism may sometimes be no more daunting or fearsome than those that face anyone in search of an independent life."

In a more mixed review, Chuck Wilson of The Village Voice called it "a charming little film in need of a bit more grit… Luke faces challenges, to be sure, both within himself and out in the world, but even the meanies at the office are only sitcom-mean. In the end, Luke's path to self-empowerment is funny and sweet and a little too easy."

Accolades

References

External links

2012 films
2012 comedy-drama films
American comedy-drama films
American independent films
2010s English-language films
Films about autism
Films set in Michigan
Films set in the 2010s
Films shot in Sault Ste. Marie, Ontario
2012 directorial debut films
2012 independent films
2010s American films
Films about disability